Lauren Barnikow (born May 21, 1982) is an American former professional tennis player.

Barnikow, a New Jersey native, was a student at Woodbridge High School.

In 2000 she reached the singles final of the Easter Bowl and was champion in the doubles. She was a junior doubles finalist at the 2000 Australian Open (with Erin Burdette).

A collegiate player for Stanford University, Barnikow was a member of the 2001, 2002, 2004 NCAA Division I championship teams, as well as a six-time All-American.

Barnikow attained best world rankings of 418 for singles and 200 for doubles, with five ITF title wins. She featured in a WTA Tour main draw for the only time in 2005, narrowly losing in the first round of the doubles in Quebec City.

ITF circuit finals

Singles: 3 (1–2)

Doubles: 9 (4–5)

References

External links
 
 

1982 births
Living people
American female tennis players
Tennis people from New Jersey
Stanford Cardinal women's tennis players
People from Woodbridge Township, New Jersey
Sportspeople from Middlesex County, New Jersey